The People's Liberation Army Air Force Aviation University is a military university in Changchun, Jilin, China.

As of fall 2014, the university has 7 campuses, consists of 7 departments, covers a total area of 36,000 mu, with more than 19,000,000 square meters of floor space.

History
The People's Liberation Army Air Force Aviation University was originally established by the People's Liberation Army in 1946 as the "Northeastern Democratic United Army Aviation School".

On 9 June 2004, the Air Force Changchun Flight Academy, Air Force Second Aviation Academy, Air Force Seventh Flight Academy merged to form the People's Liberation Army Air Force Aviation University.

On 28 April 2012, the Air Force Thirteenth Flight Academy merged into the university.

Academic structure
 Department of Aerospace Mechanical Engineering
 Department of Aerospace Ordnance Engineering
 Department of Aerospace Control Engineering
 Department of Airline Electronic Engineering
 Department of Air Reconnaissance Intelligence
 Department of Military Simulation Engineering
 Department of Aviation Lifesaving

Library collections
The PLA Air Force Aviation University's total collection amounts to more than 612,000 items.

Notable alumni
 Li Ming (Member of the Chinese Academy of Engineering)
 Yang Liwei
 Zhai Zhigang
 Fei Junlong
 Nie Haisheng
 Liu Boming
 Jing Haipeng
 Liu Yang
 Wang Yaping
 Yu Xu
 Tang Hongbo
 Fang Ziyi

References

Military academies of China
 
Universities and colleges in Changchun
Educational institutions established in 1946
Air force academies
1946 establishments in China